Sergey Kudrin (born September 7, 1959) is an American chess Grandmaster who was born in the Soviet Union.  He achieved his Grandmaster title in 1984 going on to win chess tournaments at Copenhagen in 1983, and Beer-Sheva in 1984, and Torremolinos in 1985.  He played in the 2005 Chess World Cup at Khanty-Mansiysk, Russia seeded 102nd, the 1999 Las Vegas FIDE Chess World Championship seeded 70th, and the 2004 FIDE World Chess Championship held in Tripoli, Libya, where he was seeded 92nd.

In the United States Kudrin won third place in the 2008 Frank K. Berry United States Chess Championship in Tulsa, Oklahoma in 2008.  He is also third in the 2008 World Chess Live Grand Prix standings.  He has also been a valued member on the United States Chess League in 2007 and 2008.  Kudrin won the United States Open Championship in 1984 and 2007.

In the July 2009 FIDE list, he has an Elo rating of 2578.

GM Kudrin often has encouraged chess activities such as recruiting GM Boris Spassky to join the Western States Open in 2004 and 2005.

One of his former pupils was bandy and floorball player Alexander Hart.

References

External links

Sergey Kudrin: photo, statistics

1959 births
Living people
Chess grandmasters
American chess players
Russian chess players
Soviet chess players